Joshua Liam Wynder (born May 2, 2005) is an American professional soccer player who plays as a center-back for USL Championship club Louisville City.

Club career
Wynder signed a USL Academy contract with USL Championship side Louisville City in February 2021. On June 3, 2021, Wynder signed a professional deal with the club.

International career
At the young age of 17, Wynder was selected for the 33-player USYNT U19 Squad selected on April 21, 2022. Wynder captained the side in his debut win over England.

Career statistics

Club

Personal
Joshua's brother, Elijah, also plays for Louisville City.

References

External links
Profile at the Louisville City website

2005 births
Living people
People from Kentucky
American soccer players
Association football defenders
Louisville City FC players
USL Championship players
Soccer players from Louisville, Kentucky
Soccer players from Kentucky
United States men's youth international soccer players